The Roman Catholic Diocese of Lokossa is a diocese located in the city of Lokossa in the Ecclesiastical province of Cotonou in Benin.

History
 11 March 1968: Established as Diocese of Lokossa from the Metropolitan Archdiocese of Cotonou

Bishops
 Bishops of Lokossa (Roman rite), in reverse chronological order
 Bishop Victor Agbanou (since 5 July 2000)
 Bishop Robert Sastre (2 March 1972  – 16 January 2000)
 Bishop Christophe Adimou (11 March 1968  – 28 June 1971), appointed Archbishop of Cotonou
 Other priest of this diocese who became bishop
 Paul Kouassivi Vieira, appointed Bishop of Djougou in 1995

See also
 Roman Catholicism in Benin

References

External links
 GCatholic.org 

Lokossa
Christian organizations established in 1968
Roman Catholic dioceses and prelatures established in the 20th century
Lokossa, Roman Catholic Diocese of